Sandiford may refer to:

 Sandiford, Queensland, a locality in the Mackay Region, Queensland, Australia

People with the surname Sandiford
 Benedict Sandiford, British actor
 Jacinta Sandiford (1932–1987), Ecuadorian high jumper
 Keith A. Sandiford (born 1947), a Barbadian writer living in the United States
 Keith A. P. Sandiford (born 1936), a Barbadian writer living in Canada
 Lindsay Sandiford, British woman convicted in 2013 of drug smuggling in Indonesia
 Lloyd Erskine Sandiford (born 1937), Barbadian politician
 Robert Edison Sandiford (born 1968), Canadian writer

See also
Sandford (disambiguation)
Sandyford (disambiguation)
Standiford (disambiguation)